The 2018 Sabah state election took place on 9 May 2018 in concurrence with the 14th Malaysian general election. This election was to elect 60 members of the 15th Sabah State Legislative Assembly. The previous Assembly was dissolved on 7 April 2018.

Barisan Nasional (BN), with the most seats, would be able to form a minority government alone. But BN and Homeland Solidarity Party (STAR) decided to form a group of 31 seats, which would allow them to form a coalition government. Musa Aman reinstalled as Chief Minister on 10 May 2018.

However, Sabah Heritage Party (WARISAN) (including 6 BN assemblymen who switched allegiance to WARISAN), Democratic Action Party (DAP) and People's Justice Party (PKR), with confidence and supply of United Pasokmomogun Kadazandusun Murut Organisation (UPKO), managed to form a pact of 39 seats in order to form a coalition government.

Governor Juhar Mahiruddin installed Mohd. Shafie Apdal as the 15th Chief Minister on 12 May 2018. That marks the end of 24-year rule of BN in Sabah and the change of governing party in Sabah for the fifth time since 1963.

Election pendulum
The 14th General Election witnessed 29 governmental seats (later with addition of 10 members from non-governmental seats (6 from UPKO and 4 from UMNO) that decided to support the creation of new state government) and 31 non-governmental seats (later became 21 seats after 10 of them decided to support new government) filled the Sabah State Legislative Assembly. The government side has 11 safe seat and 4 fairly safe seat, while the non-government side has 2 safe seats and 5 fairly safe seats.

Results 

The following political parties contested in this election. The following is a summary of results of this election.

Aftermath

Government formation 

In the 2018 general election, WARISAN together with the coalition of Pakatan Harapan (PH) are tied up with 29-29 seats with the Barisan Nasional in the election. Jeffrey Kitingan with his party of Homeland Solidarity Party (STAR) under the United Sabah Alliance (USA) which are not aligned from either the two sides, has won two seats in the election and subsequently emerged as the decision maker for the formation of a state government from the two sides. Kitingan then decide to team up with the BN to form coalition state government with him appointed as a Deputy Chief Minister while Musa Aman from BN to become the Chief Minister for another 5 years under the new coalition government. However, the situation changed when six seats assemblymen from the BN allied parties of United Pasokmomogun Kadazandusun Murut Organisation (UPKO) and United Sabah People's Party (PBRS) switched their allegiance to WARISAN, giving Shafie an advantage with 35 seats which is sufficient to establish a coalition state government. Earlier, Musa Aman had initially been sworn in as Chief Minister following the help of two seats from STAR. This situation has left Sabah with two ruling Chief Ministers, the second time in its history since the dispute between PBS and USNO in 1980s.

The result of these events sparks a constitutional crisis in Sabah, and the need to review and change the current constitution so as to curb the "allegiance switching" of assemblymen, after the swearing-in ceremony of the chief minister. Another four seats assemblymen from BN allied parties of UMNO and UPKO switching their allegiance to WARISAN on 13 May 2018. The Yang di-Pertua Negeri (TYT) Juhar Mahiruddin also had requested for Musa to step down, despite Musa still stressing that he still the rightful Chief Minister. Musa was then issued a letter from the TYT that he is no longer the Chief Minister effective from 12 May 2018 that was delivered into his residence on 14 May 2018.

Snap election 

The state government led by Shafie only lasts 26 months, when another constitutional crisis between Shafie and Musa resulted in the Governor of Sabah, Juhar Mahiruddin decision to dissolve the State Legislative Assembly on the advice of Shafie on 30 June 2020. The 2020 election took place on 26 September 2020.

References 

2018
2018 elections in Malaysia
May 2018 events in Malaysia
Elections in Sabah